Miltu (also known as Miltou or Gàlì) is an endangered Afro-Asiatic language spoken in southwestern Chad, in villages along the Chari River in the area of Bousso. A 1993 census reported 270 speakers. Speakers are shifting to Bagirmi.

Notes 

East Chadic languages
Languages of Chad
Endangered Afroasiatic languages